Mualang (also Moealang or Dayak Mualang) are an indigenous people of West Kalimantan from the Dayak group and a sub-ethnic of the Iban people. They speak the Mualang language and they are mostly concentrated in areas in the Sekadau Regency and Sintang Regency of West Kalimantan, Indonesia. The specific districts where the Mualang people live include:
 Belitang Hilir district, Sekadau
 Belitang district, Sekadau
 Belitang Hulu district, Sekadau
 Sepauk, Sintang and its surrounding region

Language
The Mualang language belongs to the Ibanic languages branch along with other Ibanic dialects such as Kantuk, Bugao, Desa, Seberuang, Ketungau and Sebaruk. These dialects mainly differ from one another in their pronunciations of specific phonemes. For example, words that end with "i" can be pronounced as "e" or "y" where "kediri" becomes "kedire", "rari" becomes "rare", "inai" becomes "inay", and "pulai" becomes "pulay". These words still carry the same meaning even though they are pronounced differently. These dialects also have some lexical variation between them.

Culture

Traditional Folk Song

 Meh Bujang
 De Kutak Katik
 Aboh Beramay

Traditional Dance

 Mualang Ngajad Kayau, a warrior dance
 Tari Pingan Mualang / Tari Pireng Mualang, found in Belitang Ilek, Belitang Tengah and Belitang Hulu
 Tari Pedang Mualang / Ngajat Bebunoh, a war dance performed by men found throughout Belitang Ilek (Merbang and its surrounding) and Belitang Hulu (Sebetung and its surrounding)
 Ajat Temuai Datai, loosely translated as "Welcoming Guest" dance performed by couples and it is found in Belitang Ilek, Belitung Tengah, Belitung Hulu and its surrounding region

Handicraft
 Kumpang Ilong weaving in Belitang Hulu district

References

Ethnic groups in Indonesia
Dayak people